A. V. P. Asaithambi  Born on May 28, 1924 at Virudhunagar, was a Tamil Nadu politician, belonging to DMK party. He was elected to the Tamil Nadu Legislative Assembly in 1957 from Thousand Lights constituency as a  Dravida Munnetra Kazhagam party candidate and 1967 from Egmore constituency as a Dravida Munnetra Kazhagam candidate. He was also elected to Lok Sabha in 1977 from Chennai North constituency as a Dravida Munnetra Kazhagam candidate. Collectrate office building in Virudhunagar is named after him. He was a dialogue writer for a film Sarvadhikari made in 1951. He died on 7 April 1979.

References 

Dravida Munnetra Kazhagam politicians
Year of birth missing
1979 deaths
India MPs 1977–1979
Lok Sabha members from Tamil Nadu
Politicians from Chennai
Madras MLAs 1957–1962
Tamil Nadu MLAs 1967–1972